Kyle Bailey (born March 10, 1982) is an American former professional basketball player and current assistant coach for the Gunma Crane Thunders of Japan's B.League.

Biography 
Born in Fairbanks, Alaska, Bailey began his active career during his studies at Santa Clara University where he set team records for most games (127), minutes played (3,897), and the single-season record for most three-pointers attempted with 198 (all since broken). He was also named to the 2002 All-West Coast Conference First Team.

After graduating in 2005, he was selected in the 2005 NBA Development League Draft by the Florida Flame, although he never played in a game for them. In 2006, he moved to Germany to BG Göttingen. That same year he received the award of the Most Valuable Player of the 2nd Basketball Bundesliga North.

References

External links
NBA D-League Draft profile

1982 births
Living people
American expatriate basketball people in Germany
American expatriate basketball people in Japan
American expatriate basketball people in Latvia
American men's basketball players
Basketball players from Alaska
BG Göttingen players
Riesen Ludwigsburg players
Sportspeople from Fairbanks, Alaska
Ratiopharm Ulm players
Santa Clara Broncos men's basketball players
Shooting guards
Sun Rockers Shibuya coaches